Clive Denby Matthewson  (born 1944) is a New Zealand civil engineer and former politician.

Biography

Early life and career
Matthewson was born in Wellington in 1944. He was educated at Waitaki Boys' High School and University of Canterbury. He has a PhD in Civil Engineering which he completed in 1970. The title of his PhD thesis was: "The elastic behaviour of a laterally loaded pile". He worked as a civil engineer until he was elected to parliament in 1984.

Political career

He was chairman of the  electorate for the Labour Party and also a member of Labour's governing body the New Zealand Council. Two years later he stood for the Labour candidacy for the  seat in a by-election, but was again unsuccessful.

In the 1983 electoral redistribution, the number of Dunedin electorates was reduced from three to two. Brian MacDonell, who had since  represented , was supposed to represent the new Dunedin West electorate. However, Labour's president, Jim Anderton, presided over MacDonell's de-selection and installed his personal friend Matthewson instead. Matthewson was considered one of the most effective backbenchers in the Fourth Labour Government. In August 1989, he was appointed by Prime Minister Geoffrey Palmer as Under-Secretary to the Minister of Health and Labour.

In February 1990, he was elected to cabinet and was appointed by Palmer as Minister of State Services, Minister of Science, Minister in charge of the Audit Department and Associate Minister of State Owned Enterprises, Energy, Commerce and Labour.

After the government was defeated he was appointed Shadow Minister of Social Security and State Services by Labour leader Mike Moore in 1991. He left Labour in 1995 to jointly establish the United New Zealand party with six other sitting MPs. Matthewson became United's leader, and when the party formed a coalition with the governing National Party in 1996 he was made a Cabinet Minister. In the 1996 election, Peter Dunne was the only United politician to keep his seat, and Matthewson, who had contested the new  electorate, did not return to Parliament.

In the 1998 New Year Honours, he was appointed a Member of the New Zealand Order of Merit, for public services as a Member of Parliament.

At the 1998 local-body elections Matthewson ran for the position of Mayor of Dunedin, but was defeated by incumbent Sukhi Turner.

Post-politics
He was the Director of Development and Alumni Relations at the University of Otago from 2002 to 2008, and between 23 July 2004 and 30 September 2008 was on the board of directors for the New Zealand Railways Corporation.

Personal life
Matthewson is married with five children. Katherine Rich, a former National Party MP, is his niece.

Notes

References

1944 births
Living people
People educated at Waitaki Boys' High School
Members of the New Zealand Order of Merit
New Zealand Labour Party MPs
Leaders of political parties in New Zealand
Engineers from Dunedin
United New Zealand MPs
University of Canterbury alumni
New Zealand MPs for Dunedin electorates
Unsuccessful candidates in the 1981 New Zealand general election
Unsuccessful candidates in the 1996 New Zealand general election
Members of the New Zealand House of Representatives
New Zealand civil engineers
Academic staff of the University of Otago